Cesidio Guazzaroni (5 January 1911 in Loreto Aprutino – 2 October 2004 in Rome) was an Italian diplomat who served as a European Commissioner  from 1976 to 1977.

When Altiero Spinelli resigned from the Ortoli Commission in 1976, Guazzaroni was appointed to replace him as Commissioner for Industry and Technology.  He held office from 1976 to 6 January 1977.

He later served as the Italian ambassador to Switzerland.

Honors
 Order of Merit of the Italian Republic 1st Class / Knight Grand Cross – June 2, 1975

See also
 Ministry of Foreign Affairs (Italy)
 Foreign relations of Italy

References 

1911 births
2004 deaths
Ambassadors of Italy to Switzerland
Italian diplomats
20th-century diplomats
Italian European Commissioners
European Commissioners 1973–1977
People from the Province of Pescara
Knights Grand Cross of the Order of Merit of the Italian Republic